Neil James Burns (born 11 June 1945) is a Scottish former professional footballer who played in the Football League for Mansfield Town.

References

1945 births
Living people
Scottish footballers
Association football forwards
English Football League players
Crewe Alexandra F.C. players
Bethesda Athletic F.C. players
Mansfield Town F.C. players
Corby Town F.C. players
Rushden Town F.C. players
Desborough Town F.C. players
Rothwell Town F.C. players